Alien Contact is a 1983 board game published by Phoenix Enterprises.

Gameplay
Alien Contact is a strategic science fiction game of Space Imperialism, in which the Council of Six has agreed to divide a large volume of space according to the outcome of some stylized warfare.

Reception
Steve List reviewed Alien Contact in Ares Magazine #17 and commented that "This one could be a lot of tune for multi-player situations, but only if someone tightens up the rules and all the players agree to the fixes."
 
Tony Watson reviewed Alien Contact in Space Gamer No. 69. Watson commented that "Alien Contact is an honest effort, and certainly not the sort of unmitigated turkey that all too often winds up on the game store shelves, but it's not particularly innovative or exciting. If you don't mind plunking down [the money] on a game that is just OK, then this might be a good choice. More discriminating players should seek to play out their imperialistic ambitions through a more suitable vehicle."

Reviews
Asimov's Science Fiction v8 n2 (1984 02)

References

Board games introduced in 1983